Weston Manor is an 18th-century plantation house on the south shore of the Appomattox River in Hopewell, Virginia.

History 

William and Christian Eppes Gilliam built their home, Weston Manor, in 1789 on land in Prince George County that was acquired two years earlier from her cousin John Wayles Eppes. The Gilliam family arrived in Virginia in the 17th century as indentured servants. By the late 18th century through hard work and smart marriages the family had amassed several plantations in the area. Christian was the daughter of Richard Eppes of neighboring Appomattox Plantation. Weston Manor was originally known as Western Manor because it was west of Appomattox Plantation, also known as Appomattox Manor.

Current status 
Weston Manor is listed on the National Register of Historic Places. It is noted for its period interior.

External links 
Weston Manor

References

Houses on the National Register of Historic Places in Virginia
Houses completed in 1780
Houses in Hopewell, Virginia
Museums in Hopewell, Virginia
Plantation houses in Virginia
Historic house museums in Virginia
Georgian architecture in Virginia
National Register of Historic Places in Hopewell, Virginia